Dehliz-e Do (also Romanized as Dehlīz-e Do) is a village in Jahad Rural District, Hamidiyeh District, Ahvaz County, Khuzestan Province, Iran. At the 2006 census, its population was 119, in 18 families.

References 

Populated places in Ahvaz County